166 Squadron may refer to:

166 Squadron (Israel)
No. 166 Squadron RAF, United Kingdom
166th Aero Squadron, United States Army Air Service
166th Fighter Squadron, United States Air Force
166th Air Refueling Squadron, United States Air Force
VMM-166, United States Marine Corps